Karl, or Carl, August Teich (1838 Harthau-Chemnitz - 1908  Harthau) was a German entomologist who specialised in Lepidoptera especially of the Baltic region. He described Caryocolum crepusculella, Gelechia bergiella and Gelechia farinosa among others. Fragments of his microlepidoptera collections are held by the Latvian Museum of Natural History. The bulk did not survive.

Works
Partial list
Teich, C.A., 1881  Lepidopterologische Bemerkungen Entomologische Zeitung (Stettin) 42: 187-189
Teich, 1886 Lepidopterologisches aus Livland Stettiner Entomologische Zeitung 47 : 168-171
Teich, C. A., 1889  Baltische Lepidopteren-Fauna. I-IX , 1-152. Riga.
Teich, C. A., 1908 Lepidopterologische Notizen. KorrespBl. NaturfVer. Riga 51: 37-40.

References
Gaedike, R.; Groll, E. K. & Taeger, A. 2012: Bibliography of the Entomological Literature from the Beginning Until 1863: Online Database – Version 1.0 – Senckenberg Deutsches Entomologisches Institut.
Groll, E. K. 2017: Biographies of the Entomologists of the World. – Online database, version 8, Senckenberg Deutsches Entomologisches Institut, Müncheberg – URL: sdei.senckenberg.de/biografies
Anonym 1909: [Teich, K. A.] Correspondenzblatt des Naturforschenden Vereins zu Riga, Riga 52,  pp. 1–2

German lepidopterists
1908 deaths
1838 births